György Pauk (born 26 October 1936) is a Hungarian violinist, chamber musician and music pedagogue.

Biography
Pauk was born in Budapest, (Hungary), and entered the Franz Liszt Academy of Music at age nine. He began his studies as Imre Waldbauer's pupil in 1945. From 1947-1949 he studied with János Temesváry, and from 1949 till he graduated at the Academy with Ede Zathureczky, and he studied under Zoltán Kodály. In 1956 he left Hungary for the Netherlands and, after being persuaded by violinist Yehudi Menuhin, he permanently settled in London in 1961.

He has performed as concerto soloist with renowned orchestras and maestros around the world, with Pierre Boulez, Sir Colin Davis, Lorin Maazel, Gennady Rozhdestvensky, Simon Rattle and Sir Georg Solti. He has also recorded, and has premiered works by Witold Lutosławski, Krzysztof Penderecki, Alfred Schnittke, Sir Peter Maxwell Davies, and Sir Michael Tippett conducted by the composers themselves.

As a chamber musician Pauk's repertoire, includes all of the Mozart sonatas – which he has also recorded – the Schubert sonatas, and Bartók's works written for the violin. Pauk and pianist Peter Frankl formed a long-term collaboration with cellist Ralph Kirshbaum. Pauk and Frankl have been permanent partners since they were children. They studied chamber music with Leo Weiner. The BBC commissioned Fourteen Little Pictures by James MacMillan to mark the 25th anniversary of their trio in 1997. 

Pauk was appointed the Professor of Violin at the Royal Academy of Music in London in 1987. He named the violin department which he heads at the Royal Academy of Music after Ede Zathureczky, because he would like to preserve and carry on the legacy of the legendary master. At Annie Fischer's encouragement and invitation, in 1973 Pauk appeared once again in Budapest; since then he had been a frequent performer in Hungary both as soloist and as chamber musician.

He retired from the concert stage in 2007.

In addition, Pauk gives master classes around the world, at the International Menuhin Music Academy. He regularly visits the US where he is giving master classes in Los Angeles, San Francisco, Oberlin College Ohio and Juilliard School of Music in New York. Pauk is online Master Teacher at iClassical Academy with whom he has recorded several online Masterclasses.

Recordings of three masterclasses from the 2010 Lake District Summer Music International Summer Music Academy have recently been made available online through vimeo.com

He has been playing on his Massart Stradivarius of 1714, from Antonio Stradivari's Golden Period.

He has two children who both live and work in London, and four grandchildren.

Autobiography 
 Négy húron pendülök. Nyolcvan év emlékei. (in Hungarian)  Budapest, 2016. Park Könyvkiadó.

Awards
 First Prize in the 1956 (first) Paganini Competition in Genoa, Italy
 Premier Grand Prix in 1959 at the Marguerite Long-Jacques Thibaud Competition
 First Prize at the Munich Sonata Competition with Peter Frankl (1956) 
 Cecilia Prize for Outstanding Recordings 
 Grammy nomination for Record of the Year
 Professor Emeritus of the Franz Liszt Academy in Budapest
 Honorary Doctorate by the University of London 2016

Notable students
Pauk's notable students include: Thomas Gould. Maureen Smith, Marianne Thorsen, Gyula Stuller, and Lucy Gould.

References

Notes

Sources
 Pauk, György (2021). A Life in Music: Memories of 80 years with the Violin. London:GP Publications.

External links
 Biography at Naxos Records
 Biography of György Pauk at the Royal Academy of Music
 Biography at violin.org
 Masterclass at Lake District Summer Music
 Notable Alumni  at Franz Liszt Academy of Music
 International Menuhin Music Academy György Pauk 

Hungarian classical violinists
Male classical violinists
1936 births
Living people
Academics of the Royal Academy of Music
Paganini Competition prize-winners
Long-Thibaud-Crespin Competition prize-winners
21st-century classical violinists
21st-century Hungarian male musicians